Croker Hill stands just outside the western edge of the Peak District national park, overlooking Congleton in Cheshire. Near the summit stands the Sutton Common BT Tower, built during the 1960s.

Popular with hill walkers, Croker Hill offers fine views of the Cheshire Plain; on clear days, Manchester city centre and as far away as Snowdon can be seen.

Mountains and hills of the Peak District
Hills of Cheshire